is a 2015 Japanese comedy drama film directed by Toshio Lee (ja). It was released on January 17, 2015.

Cast
Shinichi Tsutsumi
Machiko Ono
Naoto Inti Raymi
Nanao
Hiroshi Tamaki

Reception
The film has earned ¥45,070,100 at the Japanese box office.

References

External links
 

2015 comedy-drama films
Japanese comedy-drama films
2010s Japanese films
2010s Japanese-language films